Armando Mendoza (born 26 April 1948) is a Venezuelan boxer. He competed in the men's lightweight event at the 1968 Summer Olympics.

References

External Links
 

1948 births
Living people
Venezuelan male boxers
Olympic boxers of Venezuela
Boxers at the 1968 Summer Olympics
Boxers at the 1967 Pan American Games
Pan American Games bronze medalists for Venezuela
Pan American Games medalists in boxing
Sportspeople from Maracay
Lightweight boxers
Medalists at the 1967 Pan American Games